The ATP Challenger Torino is a tennis tournament held in Turin, Italy since 2015. The event is part of the ATP Challenger Tour and is played on outdoor clay courts.

Past finals

Singles

Doubles

 
ATP Challenger Tour
Tennis tournaments in Italy
Clay court tennis tournaments